Rawalpindi Railway Station (Urdu and ) is located in Saddar area of Rawalpindi, Punjab, Pakistan. It is one of several major stops on the Karachi–Peshawar Railway Line. The nearest Saddar Metrobus Station, part of the Rawalpindi-Islamabad Metrobus is 20 minutes (1.5 km) walk away.

From Rawalpindi Railway Station trains go to various cities of Pakistan including Karachi, Lahore, Quetta , Peshawar, Gujranwala, Sargodha, Gujarat, Multan, Faisalabad, Bahawalpur, Rahimyar Khan, Jhang, Hyderabad, Nawabshah, Sukkar, Jehlum, Haripur, Nowshera, Sibi, Attock, Larkana, Kohat, Khanewal, Mianwali, Dera Ghazi Khan, Bhakkar, Gujar Khan, Sialkot, Narowal, Sahiwal, Okara, Mandi Bahauddin and Jacobabad included. Every train stops at Rawalpindi railway station for half an hour.

History
Rawalpindi station was opened in 1881, during construction of the Punjab Northern State Railway which began in 1870. The route was first surveyed in 1857, and aimed to connect Lahore with Peshawar via Rawalpindi. Years of political and military debate followed as described under the "Lahore & Peshawar Railway". Along with several other railways, the Punjab Northern State Railway was merged with the Scinde, Punjab & Delhi Railway in 1886 to form the North Western State Railway.

Railway Station Building

The Victorian-era Rawalpindi Railway Station is a notable example of Indo-Saracenic architecture in the region. It was built a century ago in the British styl, with yellow sandstone walls and arched entrances. Kerosene lamps adorn the walls, and there is an old grand clock near the platform and a bell that signals the arrival of a train.
The main building of Rawalpindi Railway Station consists of three sections: the freight section, the passenger section and the main offices. The Railway Club building and Police Station are adjacent to the main building. The building has three separate entrances for regular passengers and baggage passengers. The grand clock and steam engine installed in front of the main building are among the prominent features of the station.

Facilities
Facilities include railway reservations and information office, cargo pick and drop, toilets, tuck shops, book stalls, praying halls and rest areas.

Services
Trains that stop at Rawalpindi Station are as follows:

Location 
Rawalpindi Railway Station is located in Rawalpindi. The historic railway station is located in the centre of the city on Station Road in the Saddar area and close to the historic Raja Bazaar. Along with Rawalpindi railway station there is Islamabad Railway Station of the capital of Pakistan. And Golra Sharif Railway Museum is also near the station.

Number of passengers
Every day, about 15000 passengers travel from this station to the entire country. There are about 150 station porters or coolies at this station. The station has five platforms 1,800 feet long and 150 feet wide.

Connections
The nearest Saddar Metrobus Station, part of the Rawalpindi-Islamabad Metrobus corridor is 20 mins (1.5 km) walk away.

Railway General Hospital Rawalpindi
Railway General Hospital Rawalpindi is a PMC certified intensive care hospital in Westridge near Rawalpindi railway station, and Pakistan Railways serving employees and retired employees are treated free of cost in the hospital.

See also
 Pakistan Railways
 List of railway stations in Pakistan

References

External links

Railway stations in Rawalpindi District
Railway stations opened in 1881
1881 establishments in India
Railway stations on Karachi–Peshawar Line (ML 1)